"The Jack-Rabbit" is a poem from Wallace Stevens's first book of poetry, Harmonium (1923).

Overview

The jack-rabbit's joyful jig contrasts with the prospect of its demise, anticipated by the black man who invokes a symbol of death
that applies both to his grandmother and her burial garment, and to the dancing jack-rabbit. Buttel views the black man's words as a fusion of the native folk tradition with the motif of sewing and embroidering from Jules Laforgue, a French Symbolist poet who was influenced by Walt Whitman and in turn influenced Stevens (as well as T. S. Eliot and Ezra Pound). Buttel notes that the buzzard appears frequently in native folk and humorous literature, and that Stevens uses it several times in his poems, "along with bantams, grackles, and turkey-cocks".

Notes

References 

 Buttel, R. Wallace Stevens: The Making of Harmonium. Princeton University Press, 1968.
 Kermode, Frank and Joan Richardson, eds, Stevens: Collected Poetry & Prose. Library of America, 1997.

1923 poems
American poems
Poetry by Wallace Stevens